Bi-Polar Blues is the tenth album by guitarist/vocalist Richie Kotzen.

Track listing
All tracks composed by Richie Kotzen; except where indicated

Personnel
Richie Kotzen – lead vocals, guitar, wurlitzer piano, bass, drums
Rob Harrington – bass (on "Tobacco Road" & "Thrill Is Gone")
Matt Luneau – drums (on "Gone Tomorrow Blues", "They're Red Hot","Tobacco Road", "Thrill Is Gone" & "From Four Till Late")

References

1999 albums
Richie Kotzen albums